Tentaspina paraorienta is a moth of the family Erebidae first described by Michael Fibiger in 2011. It is found in Indonesia (it was described from western Java).

The wingspan is about 11 mm. The forewings are greyish light brown, with grey-brown areas. The colour is black at the base of the costa and the upper medial area. The subterminal and terminal areas are dark grey. The crosslines are untraceable or weakly defined, though a dark brown, waved subterminal line is present and the terminal line is indicated by black interveinal dots. The hindwings are grey. The underside of the forewings are unicolorous brown and the underside hindwings are grey with a discal spot.

References

Micronoctuini
Moths described in 2011
Taxa named by Michael Fibiger